Cribrochamus cribrosus is a species of beetle in the family Cerambycidae, and the sole member of the genus Cribrochamus. It was described by Lameere in 1893, originally as "Monohammus" cribrosus.

References

Lamiini
Beetles described in 1893